Chartergellus jeannei is a new wasp species described by specimens found at the Ducke Reserve in Manaus Brazil. The species in named in honor of Professor Robert L. Jeanne an animal behaviorist and expert in social wasps.

References

Vespidae
Arthropods of Brazil
Insects described in 2015